is a Japanese actor.

Early life
Born in Tokyo, but raised in Hiroshima Prefecture, Ukaji was the leader of one of Japan's largest bosozoku groups before becoming an actor. His mother is Shizue Ukaji, a prominent Ainu poet and artist.

Career
Ukaji appeared in Shinji Aoyama's 2011 film Tokyo Park.

Filmography

Film
 Passenger: Sugisarishi Hibi (1987)
 Osu!! Karate Bu (1990)
 Score (1995)
 Ultraman Gaia: Gaia Once Again (2001)
 Joker (1998)
 GTO (1999)
 Gun Crazy: A Woman from Nowhere (2002)
 Nin x Nin (2004)
 Sen no Kaze ni Natte (2004)
 Eiko (2004)
 Awakening (2006)
 Fist of the North Star: The Legends of the True Savior (2006-2008)
 20th Century Boys (2008)
 Zatoichi: The Last (2010)
 Kamen Rider × Kamen Rider OOO & W Featuring Skull: Movie War Core (2010)
 Kamen Rider OOO Wonderful: The Shogun and the 21 Core Medals (2011)
 Kamen Rider × Kamen Rider Fourze & OOO: Movie War Mega Max (2011)
 Gaku: Minna no Yama (2011)
 Wild 7 (2011)
 Tokyo Park (2011)
 Strawberry Night (2013)
 Kingdom (2019), Wei Xing
 Masquerade Hotel (2019), Mitsuhiro Tatebayashi
 Saber + Zenkaiger: Super Hero Senki (2021), Kōsei Kōgami
 Last of the Wolves (2021), Akira Mizoguchi
 Tombi: Father and Son (2022)
 Shikkokuten (2022)

Television

 Kimi ga Uso o Tsuita (1988)
 Aishiatteru Kai (1989)
 Miseinen (1995)
 Toumei Ningen (1996)
 Ginrou Kaiki File (1996)
 Tsubasa wo Kudasai! (1996)
 Narita Rikon (1997)
 Kin no Tamago (1997)
 Aoi Tori (1997)
 Hitotsu Yane no Shita 2 (1997)
 Jinbē (1998)
 Ultraman Gaia (1998-1999)
 Psychometrer Eiji 2 (1999)
 Perfect Love (1999)
 Lipstick (1999)
 Hensyuo (2000)
 Hōjō Tokimune (2001) - Kujō Yoritsune
 Star no Koi (2001)
 Hero (2001)
 Mama no Idenshi (2002)
 Kaidan Hyaku Monogatari (2002)
 Kyohansha (2003)
 Shinsengumi! (2004)
 Umeko (2005)
 Nobuta wo Produce (2005)
 Water Boys 2005 Natsu (2005)
 Rikon Bengoshi 2 (2005)
 Hana Yome wa Yakudoshi (2006)
 Hanazakari no Kimitachi e (2007)
 Legends of the Dark King (2008)
 Kamen Rider OOO (2010-2011) - Kousei Kougami
 Taira no Kiyomori (2012) - Minamoto no Yorimasa
 A Chef of Nobunaga (2013)
 Gunshi Kanbei (2014) - Shimizu Muneharu
 Naotora: The Lady Warlord (2017) - Ii Naomitsu
 BG Personal Bodyguard (2018)
 Natsuzora (2019)
 The Sun Stands Still: The Eclipse (2020)
 The Fugitive (2020) - Tomohisa Ōiso
 Utsubyō 9dan (2020) - Daisuke Suzuki
 The Supporting Actors 3 (2021) - Himself

Dubbing
 Samurai Jack (2002) - Jack

References

External links
 
 
 
 
 Talent Agency Abebe

20th-century Japanese male actors
Male voice actors from Tokyo Metropolis
Male actors from Tokyo
People from Shinjuku
Japanese Ainu people
1962 births
Japanese male film actors
Japanese male television actors
Japanese male voice actors
Living people
21st-century Japanese male actors